This is a list of electoral district results for the 1977 Queensland state election.

Results by electoral district

Albert

Archerfield

Ashgrove

Aspley

Auburn

Balonne

Barambah

Barron River

Brisbane Central

Bulimba

Bundaberg

Burdekin

Burnett

Caboolture

Cairns

Callide

Carnarvon

Chatsworth

Condamine

Cook

Cooroora

Cunningham

Everton

Fassifern

Flinders

Greenslopes

Gregory

Gympie

By-election 

 This by-election was caused by the resignation of Max Hodges. It was held on 1 September 1979.

|- style="background-color:#E9E9E9"
! colspan="6" style="text-align:left;" |After distribution of preferences

 Preferences were not distributed to completion.

Hinchinbrook

Ipswich

Ipswich West

Isis

Ithaca

Kurilpa

Landsborough

Lockyer

Lytton

Mackay

Mansfield

Maryborough

Merthyr

Mirani

Mount Coot-tha

Mount Gravatt

Mount Isa

Mourilyan

Mulgrave

Murrumba

Nudgee

Nundah

Peak Downs

Pine Rivers

Port Curtis

Redcliffe

By-election 

 This by-election was caused by the resignation of Jim Houghton. It was held on 1 September 1979.

Redlands

Rockhampton

Rockhampton North

Roma

Salisbury

Sandgate

Sherwood

By-election 

 This by-election was caused by the death of John Herbert. It was held on 25 November 1978.

|- style="background-color:#E9E9E9"
! colspan="6" style="text-align:left;" |After distribution of preferences

 Preferences were not distributed to completion.

Somerset

South Brisbane

South Coast

Southport

Stafford

Surfers Paradise

Toowong

Toowoomba North

Toowoomba South

Townsville

Townsville South

Townsville West

Warrego

Warwick

Wavell

Whitsunday

Windsor

Wolston

Woodridge

Wynnum

Yeronga

See also 

 1977 Queensland state election
 Members of the Queensland Legislative Assembly, 1977–1980

References 

Results of Queensland elections